Fedor Chervyakov (born 13 January 1993) is a Russian tennis player.

Chervyakov has a career high ATP singles ranking of 781 achieved on 9 May 2016. He also has a career high ATP doubles ranking of 1114 achieved on 20 June 2016.

Chervyakov made his ATP main draw debut at the 2015 Istanbul Open in the doubles draw partnering Mark Fynn.

References

External links

1993 births
Living people
Russian male tennis players
Sportspeople from Izhevsk